In number theory, a weird number is a natural number that is abundant but not semiperfect.
In other words, the sum of the proper divisors (divisors including 1 but not itself) of the number is greater than the number, but no subset of those divisors sums to the number itself.

Examples 

The smallest weird number is 70. Its proper divisors are 1, 2, 5, 7, 10, 14, and 35; these sum to 74, but no subset of these sums to 70. The number 12, for example, is abundant but not weird, because the proper divisors of 12 are 1, 2, 3, 4, and 6, which sum to 16; but 2 + 4 + 6 = 12.

The first few weird numbers are 
 70, 836, 4030, 5830, 7192, 7912, 9272, 10430, 10570, 10792, 10990, 11410, 11690, 12110, 12530, 12670, 13370, 13510, 13790, 13930, 14770, ... .

Properties 

Infinitely many weird numbers exist. For example, 70p is weird for all primes p ≥ 149. In fact, the set of weird numbers has positive asymptotic density.

It is not known if any odd weird numbers exist. If so, they must be greater than 1021.

Sidney Kravitz has shown that for k a positive integer, Q a prime exceeding 2k, and

also prime and greater than 2k, then

is a weird number.
With this formula, he found the large weird number

Primitive weird numbers
A property of weird numbers is that if n is weird, and p is a prime greater than the sum of divisors σ(n), then pn is also weird. This leads to the definition of primitive weird numbers, i.e. weird numbers that are not a multiple of other weird numbers . There are only 24 primitive weird numbers smaller than a million, compared to 1765 weird numbers up to that limit. The construction of Kravitz yields primitive weird numbers, since all weird numbers of the form  are primitive, but the existence of infinitely many k and Q which yield a prime R is not guaranteed. It is conjectured that there exist infinitely many primitive weird numbers, and Melfi has shown that the infiniteness of primitive weird numbers is a consequence of Cramér's conjecture.
Primitive weird numbers with as many as 16 prime factors and 14712 digits have been found.

See also
 Untouchable number

References

External links 

 

Divisor function
Integer sequences